Ritzing is a town in the district of Oberpullendorf in the Austrian state of Burgenland.

Population

Sport
It is most famous for its football club, the SC Ritzing. The Arsenal FC football team played a Burgenland XI in the town, on Monday, July 28, 2008, and beat the team 10–2, with Arsenal scoring 7 goals before half time.

References

Cities and towns in Oberpullendorf District